Pimelic acid is the organic compound with the formula HO2C(CH2)5CO2H. Pimelic acid is one  unit longer than a related dicarboxylic acid, adipic acid, a precursor to many polyesters and polyamides. However compared to adipic acid, pimelic acid is relatively small in importance industrially. Derivatives of pimelic acid are involved in the biosynthesis of the amino acid lysine and the vitamin biotin.

Synthesis

Biosynthesis
The biosynthesis of pimelic acid is unknown but is speculated to start with malonyl CoA.

Chemical and industrial routes
Like other simple dicarboxylic acids, many methods have been developed for producing pimelic acid.
Pimelic acid is produced commercially by oxidation of cycloheptanone with dinitrogen tetroxide.  Other routes include the relatively unselective oxidation of palmitic acid and the carbonylation of caprolactone.

Niche methods
Many other methods exist.  Pimelic acid has been synthesized from cyclohexanone and from salicylic acid. In the former route, the additional carbon is supplied by dimethyloxalate, which reacts with the enolate.

In other syntheses, pimelic acid is made from cyclohexene-4-carboxylic acid, and a fourth method also exists based on the 1,4 reaction of malonate systems with acrolein.

Several patents exist for the production of pimelic acid.

See also 
 Diaminopimelic acid

References 

Dicarboxylic acids